Michael Baum (born May 28, 1962) is an American entrepreneur and investor. He is best known as the founder & CEO of Splunk, a big data software technology used for understanding machine-generated data primarily for systems management, security forensics, compliance reporting and real-time operational intelligence.  Baum is the founder of six technology start-ups, five of which have been acquired and one (NASDAQ: SPLK) which went public. He has also been a venture capital investor with Rembrandt Venture Partners, Advent International and Crosspoint Venture Partners.  Baum graduated with a computer science degree from Drexel University and an MBA from The Wharton School at the University of Pennsylvania. In September 2014, Baum became CEO & Propriétaire of Château de Pommard, a Burgundy winery established in 1726.

Early life and education 
Baum was born in Philadelphia, Pennsylvania, and attended high school at Cherry Hill High School East, where he was a New Jersey state high school swimmer for four years. During his sophomore year at Drexel University, he changed majors from electrical engineering to computer science after a visit to the campus by Steve Jobs; the focus of his bachelor's degree was artificial intelligence and compiler and language theory.  During his studies he worked as an intern at the IBM Silicon Valley Lab developing language parsing engines and with IBM Entry Systems Division where he was a software engineer responsible for power-on self-test on the original IBM PC BIOS. He went on to earn a Masters of Business Administration with a focus on corporate finance from The Wharton School at the University of Pennsylvania. During his time at Wharton, Baum played hooker with the Wharton Rugby Team, and started the Wharton Venture Capital Club.

Career
During his time at college, Baum was curious to understand how computers and software could be applied to enable people to process large amounts of data in complex decision-making. He published his thesis titled Information Chunking and Human Decision Making.“When I graduated from Drexel my plan was to become a researcher, but I realized after being offered positions with companies like IBM and Microsoft that being an entrepreneur would give me a better opportunity to see my ideas make an impact on the world around me," says Baum.

Baum pursued a career in technology and entrepreneurship. He teamed with co-founders Mark Goldstein and Doug Alexander and started Reality Online, a stock market modeling company. Reality Online was funded by Venrock, the venture capital arm of the Rockefeller family, and later acquired by Reuters in 1989.

In September 2014, Baum bought Château de Pommard, a Burgundy winery established in 1726, and moved to Burgundy with his family.

Splunk 

Continuing to explore the possibilities of advancing an understanding of chaotic systems, Baum began to explore the application of search technology to large-scale machine data.  Reconnecting with Rob Das and Erik Swan in 2003, the three co-founded Splunk.  Their goal was to build a search engine for real-time flows and massive historical corpuses of machine data. Splunk was the sixth startup for Baum and the first pure-play big data company to reach significant customer and revenue scale and debut on the public markets.  Baum, Das and Swan and their team at Splunk have been awarded two US Patents for their work.

Baum was Splunk's founding CEO for the first six years. He raised $40M in venture capital financing from August Capital, Seven Rosen Funds, JK&B Capital and Ignition Partners.

References

1962 births
Living people
Businesspeople from Philadelphia
Drexel University alumni
Wharton School of the University of Pennsylvania alumni
People from Camden County, New Jersey
Splunk people